Qafa e Prushit is a mountain pass through the Albanian mountains along the border between Albania and Kosovo. A border crossing point is present here.

References 

Mountain passes of Albania
Albania–Kosovo border crossings